The UEFA European Under-19 Futsal Championship is the main futsal competition of the under-19 national futsal teams governed by UEFA (the Union of European Football Associations).

The tournament is held every two years, with the first final tournament held in September 2019 in Latvia and featuring eight teams.

Winners

Statistics

Performances by countries

Participating details

Legend

 – Champions
 – Runners-up
 – Semi-finalists

QF – Quarter-finals
GS – Group stage
Q – Qualified for upcoming tournament
 — Hosts

 •  – Did not qualify
 ×  – Did not enter
 ×  – Withdrew before qualification / Banned

See also
 UEFA Futsal Championship
 UEFA Futsal Under-21 Championship (defunct)

References

External links

 
International futsal competitions
Futsal, Under-19
Futsal competitions in Europe
European youth sports competitions
Recurring sporting events established in 2019
2019 establishments in Europe